Calcutta Tramways Company (CTC) was a state-run company that operated trams and buses in and around Kolkata (formerly known as Calcutta) in West Bengal, India. The Kolkata tram is the only operating tramway in India and is the oldest electric tram in India, operating since 1902.

CTC has been merged into WBTC since 2016.

History 

The service was discontinued on 20 November of that year. The Calcutta Tramway Company was formed and registered in London on 22 December 1880. Metre-gauge horse-drawn tram tracks were laid from Sealdah to Armenian Ghat via Bowbazar Street, Dalhousie Square and Strand Road. The route was inaugurated by the Viceroy, Lord Ripon, on 1 November 1880. In 1882, steam locomotives were deployed experimentally to haul tram cars.

The first electric tramcar in Calcutta ran from Esplanade to Kidderpore on 27 March 1902. In February 1943, the Calcutta and Howrah sections were connected by the new Howrah Bridge.

In 1951, the government of West Bengal entered an agreement with the Calcutta Tramways Company and the Calcutta Tramways Act of 1951 was enacted. The government assumed the tramways, reserving the right to purchase the system with two years' notice on 1 January 1972 or at any time thereafter. In 1967, the Government of West Bengal passed the Calcutta Tramways Company (Taking Over of Management) Act and assumed management on 19 July. On 8 November 1976, the Calcutta Tramways (Acquisition of Undertaking) ordinance was promulgated under which the company (and its assets) was nationalised.

The Tramways system had degraded by the 1990s, and Minister for Transport Shyamal Chakraborty planned to close the network.  In the meantime, Calcutta Tramways Company introduced bus service on 4 November 1992 with a fleet of 40 buses. However, Melbourne tram conductor Roberto D'Andrea befriended fellow Calcutta conductors during a 1994 visit. When D'Andrea heard about the planned closure of tram network, he suggested an art project to decorate the trams (as was done in his home city). The project increased public awareness of the tram network and its value, ultimately saving it.

Trams

The Calcutta Tramways Company Ltd operates the Kolkata tram, currently the oldest electric tramway in Asia and India's only existent tram system, since 1880.

Buses
With over 45 routes throughout Kolkata and its surrounding areas, CTC buses complement its tram service. The initial bus service was introduced from Rajabazar with a fleet of 40 buses, augmented in 1993 with service from Kidderpore depot. The Tollygunge and Belgachia depots were added in 1994 and 1995, respectively. In 2005 the CTC began bus service from Ghasbagan depot at Howrah.

Depots, terminals and workshops
There are five tram depots: Rajabazar, Gariahat, Tollygunge, Kalighat and Khidirpur. Rajabazar and Tollygunge depots are the largest in terms of tracks and area, respectively. Khidirpur depot is the oldest and Kalighat depot is the smallest. There were tram depots at Ghasbagan, Belgachhia, Park Circus and Joka which are now converted into CTC bus depots. There are also CTC bus depots in Barasat, Habra and Titagarh.

There are six tram terminals: Shyambazar, Bidhan Nagar Road, Ballygunge Station, Esplanade, B.B.D. Bagh (currently closed, work going on resume its services again) and Howrah Bridge. The Esplanade terminus serves most of the tram routes. Former tram terminals, all now either closed or converted into bus depots and terminals, had been at Shibpur, Bandhaghat, Bagbazar, Galiff Street, Kolkata High Court, Nimtala, Behala, Sealdah Station, Howrah Station, Planetarium and Racecourse.

There is one workshop: Nonapukur.

Routes 

2 routes currently operate in Kolkata. Recently AC tram was also introduced.

See also

 Trams in India
 Kolkata Metro
 Kolkata Suburban Railway
 Kolkata Circular Railway
 Kolkata Metro Rail Corporation
 Calcutta State Transport Corporation
 West Bengal Surface Transport Corporation
 South Bengal State Transport Corporation
 List of tram and light rail transit systems

References

Notes
Niyogi, S. Shake, rattle & roll. The Sunday Story, Sunday Times of India, Kolkata, 25 June 2006. Available on Times of India e-paper (paid subscription required as of 2010).
Pathak Pratap Shankar, The Sunday Story, Sunday Times of India, Kolkata.

External links
 Official website of Calcutta Tramways Company
 Urbanrail.net page with schematic map of trams in Kolkata
 Geographical map of trams in Kolkata, both past and latest updates
 Photos of trams in Kolkata 
 Department of Transport from the Government of West Bengal website
 

Tram transport in India
Railway companies of India
Metropolitan transport agencies of India
State agencies of West Bengal
Transport in Kolkata
Tram, urban railway and trolley companies
Companies based in Kolkata
Trams in Kolkata
Indian companies established in 1880
Indian companies disestablished in 2016